Verbicaro is a town and comune in the province of Cosenza in the Calabria region of southern Italy.

People
Mons. Francesco Cava – priest

International relations
 
Verbicaro is twinned with:
  Oberstenfeld, Germany

External links

Official website 

Cities and towns in Calabria